Radio Österreich International (RÖI) (Austrian Radio International) was an international radio station broadcast by ORF. 

RÖI was launched in 1955 by order of the Federal Chancellery, to increase awareness of Austria in other countries. The radio station was broadcast worldwide on  various shortwave frequencies. At the end of the 1990s, it was also broadcast on Astra Digital Radio. The station's headquarters and transmitters were in Moosbrunn, on the outskirts of Vienna.

Programming 
Programs were broadcast in different languages.

The most prominent programs were:
 Österreich-Journal (Austria Journal).  Broadcast several times every day.
 Intermedia (since 4. April 1997, originally called Kurzwellenpanorama)
 Bundesländermagazin (magazine show covering the Austrian states)
 Report from Austria

News was produced by the various ORF national radio stations.

Retreat and closure 
In 2000, the Federal Chancellery, under the cabinet Schüssel reduced the station's budget, leading to fewer programs. Some foreign offices also had to be closed.

In 2002 the Federal Chancellery ended financial support of the channel. ORF tried to continue broadcasts, using a new schedule. Programs made by national radio stations were rebroadcast to save money, for example those from Ö1, FM4 and Ö3. Regional station Ö2 contributed folk music.

At the end of 2003 the Board of Governors decided to – despite protests from staff and listeners – discontinue Radio Österreich International for financial reasons.

The transmitters and offices which had been completely modernized in 2000 are now rented to international radio stations.

Ö1 International 

Since Radio Österreich International was closed, ORF started to broadcast the Ö1 station worldwide on shortwave, but in strongly reduced coverage and audio quality. Only one element from the old RÖI remained: the "Report from Austria". It replaces the normal Ö1 schedule at various times during the day.

Other foreign language productions 
National stations also have some foreign-language programmes in their schedules.

 News in French in the Ö1 morning journal.
 News in French on FM4, also in the morning.
 News in English or bilingual shows on FM4

See also
 List of radio stations in Austria

External links

 Ö1 International Website
 Dr. Hj. Biener about the radio RÖI

Defunct radio stations in Austria
International broadcasters
ORF (broadcaster)
1955 establishments in Austria
Radio stations disestablished in 2003
2003 disestablishments in Austria 
Radio stations established in 1955